Cheng Hui (born December 23, 1972, in Zigong, Sichuan) is a female Chinese field hockey player who competed in the 2000, 2004, and 2008 Summer Olympics.

In 2000, she was part of the Chinese team which finished fifth in the women's competition. She played all seven matches and scored one goal.

In 2004, she finished fourth with the Chinese team in the women's competition. She played all six matches.

Four years later in 2008, she was part of the Chinese team which won the silver medal.

External links
 
 Athens 2004 profile at Yahoo Sports
 
 

1972 births
Living people
Field hockey players at the 2000 Summer Olympics
Field hockey players at the 2004 Summer Olympics
Field hockey players at the 2008 Summer Olympics
Olympic field hockey players of China
Chinese female field hockey players
Olympic silver medalists for China
People from Zigong
Olympic medalists in field hockey
Asian Games medalists in field hockey
Sportspeople from Sichuan
Medalists at the 2008 Summer Olympics
Field hockey players at the 1998 Asian Games
Field hockey players at the 2002 Asian Games
Asian Games gold medalists for China
Asian Games bronze medalists for China
Medalists at the 1998 Asian Games
Medalists at the 2002 Asian Games